Rgangkum is a village in Chipw Township, Kachin State, Burma.

References

Populated places in Kachin State
Villages in Myanmar